Salomatino is a rural locality (a settlement) in Salomatinskoye Rural Settlement, Kamyshinsky District, Volgograd Oblast, Russia. The population was 23 as of 2010.

Geography 
Salomatino is located 38 km west of Kamyshin (the district's administrative centre) by road. Salomatino (selo) is the nearest rural locality.

References 

Rural localities in Kamyshinsky District